The 1926 Atlantic hurricane season featured the highest number of major hurricanes at the time. At least eleven tropical cyclones developed during the season, all of which intensified into a tropical storm and eight further strengthened into hurricanes. Six hurricanes deepened into a major hurricane, which is Category 3 or higher on the modern-day Saffir–Simpson hurricane wind scale. It was a fairly active and deadly season. The first system, the Nassau hurricane, developed near the Lesser Antilles on July 22. Moving west-northwest for much of its duration, the storm struck or brush several islands of the Lesser and Greater Antilles. However, the Bahamas later received greater impact. At least 287 deaths and $7.85 million (1926 USD) in damage was attributed to this hurricane. The next cyclone primarily affected mariners in and around the Maritimes of Canada, with boating accidents and drownings resulting in between 55 and 58 fatalities. In late August, the third hurricane brought widespread impact to the Gulf Coast of the United States, especially Louisiana. Crops and buildings suffered $6 million in damage and there were 25 people killed.

The strongest and most damaging storm of the season was Hurricane Seven, nicknamed the Miami hurricane. Peaking as a Category 4 hurricane, the hurricane struck the Bahamas and Florida at a slightly weaker intensity. Much of the Miami metropolitan area was devastated by the storm. Inland, a storm surge on Lake Okeechobee flooded towns such as Clewiston and Moore Haven. The storm was a factor in ending the Florida land boom of the 1920s. Overall, the Miami hurricane resulted in at least 372 deaths and $125 million in damage. However, adjusted for wealth normalization in 2010, the damage toll would be $164.8 billion – far higher than Hurricane Katrina in 2005. The eight, ninth, and eleventh tropical storms left only minor or not impact on land. However, a powerful hurricane in October devastated Cuba, the Bahamas, and ships in the vicinity of Bermuda. At least 709 deaths were linked to the system, with 600 in Cuba alone. Damage to towns on the island exceeded $100 million. Collectively, the storms of this season left over $247.4 million in damage and at least 1,448 fatalities.

Season summary 

The season featured twelve named storms and eight of which strengthened into hurricanes. With six of those storms reaching major hurricane intensity, this was the highest number in a season on record, until being tied in 1933 and 1950 and then being surpassed in 1961. There were several cyclones that brought devastating effects, including the Nassau hurricane, the Louisiana hurricane, the Miami hurricane, and the Havana-Bermuda. Collectively, the storms of this season left over $247.4 million in damage and at least 1,448 fatalities.

Tropical cyclogenesis began on July 22 with Nassau hurricane, followed by the second storm on July 29. Only one system, the Louisiana hurricane, developed in the month of August. September was much more active, featuring the forth, fifth, six, seventh (Miami hurricane), and eighth storms of the season. On September 17, four tropical cyclones existed simultaneously in the Atlantic Ocean, three of which, in an uncommon occurrence, were then hurricanes. In October, the ninth and tenth (Havana-Bermuda) storms formed. One final tropical cyclone formed in November and existed until November 16.

The season's activity was reflected with an accumulated cyclone energy (ACE) rating of 230, the fourth highest value on record, behind only the 1893, 2005, and 1933 seasons, and far above the 1921–1930 average of 76.6. ACE is a metric used to express the energy used by a tropical cyclone during its lifetime. Therefore, a storm with a longer duration will have high values of ACE. Thus, tropical depressions are not included here.

Systems

Hurricane One 

The Nassau Hurricane of 1926 or The Great Bahamas Hurricane of 1926 or Hurricane San Liborio of 1926 

With such high pressure, it was the least intense Category 4 Atlantic hurricane on record. Thereafter, the cyclone quickly diminished in intensity, becoming a tropical depression on July 29, as it curved west-northwestward over Georgia; three days later, it became an extratropical cyclone and dissipated over Ontario, Canada, on August 2.

In Puerto Rico, the storm produced hurricane-force winds and heavy rainfall that flooded all the rivers in the southern half of the island; crops in the western portion of the island were greatly damaged, and the entire island was affected by strong winds. At least 25 people were reported to have died as a result. In the Bahamas, the cyclone killed at least 146 people and produced severe damage to the capital Nassau; it was called the worst storm to affect Nassau since the 1866 Nassau hurricane, also a Category 4 cyclone that struck New Providence and caused major flooding throughout the Bahamas. More than a week after the storm, 400 people were reported to be missing. On the east coast of Florida, the hurricane produced a large storm tide that damaged boats, docks, and coastal structures, and damaging winds destroyed barns and crops well inland; severe damage to structures and communications wires was reported at New Smyrna Beach, where the storm struck the state. One person died from the effects of the storm in Florida. In all, the hurricane caused at least 287 deaths—the fourth deadliest July hurricane since 1492— and $16.4 million (1926 USD) in losses, at least $8 million of which were in the Bahamas. It remains only the second of three recorded hurricanes since 1851 to have struck the east coast of Florida north of Cape Canaveral from the Atlantic Ocean, the others being a hurricane in 1915 and Hurricane Dora in 1964.

Hurricane Two 

The Nova Scotia Hurricane of 1926 

Over the next few days, it moved west-northwest, becoming a tropical storm by 00:00 UTC on July 31. On August 1, the cyclone turned northwestward and began strengthening rapidly, reaching hurricane intensity by the early afternoon. The next day, it attained major hurricane intensity—winds of at least , equivalent to the modern-day classification of Category 3 intensity—and over the next few days its track varied between north-northwest and northwest.

About this time, five ocean liners near each other encountered the storm; some portholes on the Orca were damaged and 15 passengers were treated for cuts, bruises, and contusions. Off Nova Scotia, the cyclone produced an unspecified number of casualties, including the sinking of the schooners Sylvia Mosher and Sadie Knickle. Between 55 and 58 deaths occurred, including 49 from two ships crashing ashore Sable Island. In Nova Scotia, the storm downed trees and electrical poles, damaging some homes and leaving telephone service outages. Crops and fruit trees were also damaged. High winds also interrupted telegraph communications in Newfoundland.

Hurricane Three 

The Louisiana hurricane of 1926 

However, prior to scientific reanalysis in April 2012 based upon a 1975 report, it was not believed to have done so until two days later. Moving west-northwest, the depression strengthened to a tropical storm on August 21, and then turned northwestward while strengthening steadily. After brushing Cape San Antonio at the western tip of Cuba on August 22, the cyclone then veered to the west-northwest. Early on August 23, the storm became a hurricane over the southern Gulf of Mexico. Later that day, the cyclone continued to intensify and began curving northwestward. Early on August 25, the cyclone peaked as a modern-day  Category 3, based on the pressure–wind relationship. In the afternoon, it struck west of Houma, Louisiana, at that intensity. Less than 24 hours later, the storm rapidly weakened to a moderate tropical storm and curved west-northwestward, weakening to a tropical depression on August 27 and dissipating over Texas.

No known effects were reported from the Caribbean due to the cyclone. On the morning of August 24, the United States Weather Bureau in Washington, D.C., advised that the storm was likely to make landfall between Galveston, Texas, and Burrwood, Louisiana. Late that day, hurricane warnings were issued from Morgan City, Louisiana, to Mobile, Alabama. Along the Gulf Coast of the United States, the storm caused $6 million (1926 USD) in damage to crops and buildings, with substantial damage to vegetation. In all, 25 deaths were reported, although extensive ship reports and timely warnings by mail, telephone, radio, and telegraph reduced the number of casualties.

August tropical depression 
A low-pressure area previously associated with an occluded frontal system gradually organized into a tropical system, becoming a tropical depression about halfway between Bermuda and North Carolina on August 23. The depression moved northeastward and dissipated on the following day.

Hurricane Four 

Thereafter, the storm for two days maintained its intensity while resuming a west-northwest track. Late on September 10, the storm abruptly turned north-northwest.

It then weakened to a tropical storm, recurved northeast, and transitioned into an extratropical cyclone on September 22, whence it reacquired hurricane-force winds. As an extratropical storm it continued north-northeastward until dissipating near Greenland on September 24. Strong winds in the province downed telegraph lines and demolished a post office in the town of Lamaline.

Hurricane Five 

This hurricane was the least intense Category 2 hurricane on record. Shortly thereafter, the system began turning north and then north-northeast on September 13, followed by steady weakening. At 00:00 UTC on September 14, the cyclone diminished in intensity to a tropical storm and moved southeast, dissipating less than 24 hours later.

Tropical Storm Six 

Without strengthening substantially, the depression moved west-northwest for the next day and a half, passing north of the Swan Islands based upon weather reports, and then curved northward. On September 13, the depression gradually curved to the northeast, and on the afternoon of September 14 it made landfall southeast of Cienfuegos, Cuba. The cyclone then crossed the central region of Cuba, entering the Bahamian islands in the evening. The weak storm then turned abruptly to the northwest, having been trapped by a building ridge, and early the next day, while centered north of Andros Island, it assumed a gradual curve to the southwest. Late that day, it degenerated into a tropical depression and dissipated over the Straits of Florida on September 17, as the Great Miami hurricane approached from just  to the east-southeast.

In Cuba, impacts were minimal. In South Florida, the cyclone did not produce tropical storm-force winds, although thunderstorms produced  of rainfall in Miami on September 16. No severe effects occurred and the storm was not mentioned in the monthly notations of the local U.S. Weather Bureau office in Miami. However, its presence and that of the Great Miami hurricane, then of Category 4 intensity and in the South-Central Bahamas, caused confusion in the local press. On the morning of September 17, one day before the Miami hurricane struck, the Miami Herald published a front-page story on the weak tropical storm in the Straits of Florida and included statements by the editors that it was not anticipated to strike Florida; news articles on the hurricane, which was expected to deliver "destructive winds" to the area, were not published by other local newspapers until the afternoon, leaving Miami residents confused as to the extent of the danger.

Hurricane Seven 

The Great Miami Hurricane of 1926 

Steadily moving north of due west, the cyclone quickly became a hurricane the next day, and over the next three days, while bypassing the Greater Antilles to the north, it continued to intensify to a major hurricane, with maximum sustained winds of at least , yet few ships were near the eye with which to determine its path. Swiftly crossing southernmost Florida, the potent hurricane weakened slightly before entering the Gulf of Mexico near Punta Rassa in the afternoon, and its path gradually curved northwest on September 19. Quickly weakening thereafter, the cyclone paralleled the coasts of Alabama and Mississippi, dissipating over Louisiana on September 22.

Throughout the Bahamas, reports of damage were relatively scarce despite the intensity with which the storm struck the region. However, numerous structures were completely destroyed. The storm was attributed to 372 deaths in the Southeastern United States, 114 of which took place in Miami and at least 150 at Moore Haven, where a storm surge estimated as high as  overtopped portions of a levee on Lake Okeechobee. Many people in Miami, transients who knew little of hurricanes, perished after examining damage during the passage of the eye, unaware that the back end of the storm was approaching. Flimsy structures built to house workers during the Florida land boom of the 1920s were completely leveled. The hurricane partially contributed to the end of the land boom, which was in decline by early 1926. In terms of monetary losses, damage from the hurricane was estimated to be as high as $125 million (1926 USD). Up to 4,725 structures throughout southern Florida were destroyed and 8,100 damaged, leaving at least 38,000 people displaced. A storm surge of  occurred south of Miami and winds on Miami Beach were recorded at  before the anemometer blew away. The entire state of Florida lost 35% of its grapefruit and orange crops combined, including nearly 100% losses in the Miami area. In a study of hurricane damage statistics conducted in 2008, it was estimated that if a storm similar to that of the Miami hurricane were to occur in 2005 it would result in over $140–157 billion in damage. In all, the storm caused at least 372 deaths along its path accounting for the revised toll in the United States since 2003. The storm's slow movement caused it to produce substantial effects to coastal regions between Mobile and Pensacola; these areas experienced heavy damage from wind, rain, and storm surge. Wind records at Pensacola indicate that the city encountered sustained winds of hurricane force for more than 20 hours, including winds above } for five hours. The storm tide destroyed nearly all waterfront structures on Pensacola Bay and peaked at  near Bagdad, Florida. Rainfall maximized at Bay Minette, Alabama, where  fell.

Hurricane Eight 

Over the next three days, it moved north of due east and rapidly strengthened, becoming a minimal hurricane by 12:00 UTC on September 22 and later peaking at —equivalent to a moderately strong Category 2 hurricane on the Saffir-Simpson Hurricane Scale—on the morning of September 24. For about 24 hours thereafter, the cyclone briefly curved to the northeast before turning sharply to the east early on September 26. Late that day, the cyclone swerved precipitously to the north, making landfall on the island of São Miguel near Ponta Delgada at peak intensity. Curving northwest and then south of due west, the cyclone weakened after striking São Miguel and reverted to a minimal hurricane late on September 27. It gradually completed a counter-clockwise loop through the western Azores, curving due south as a tropical storm, though its cool surface temperatures and enlarged size suggest it might have been a subtropical cyclone then. Just afterward, late on September 28, it hit Faial Island near Horta with sustained winds near . Over the next two days, it moved generally south-southeast and slowly weakened, curving suddenly east-southeast beginning on September 30. Turning south of due east, it dissipated by 18:00 UTC on October 1.

September tropical depression 
Another tropical depression formed north of the Virgin Islands on September 26. The depression tracked west-northwestward, until curving sharply east-northeastward on September 29. The depression transitioned into an extratropical cyclone early on October 1 and merged with a frontal system while situated near Bermuda. However, with no other reports of gale-force winds, the system was not reclassified as a tropical storm.

Tropical Storm Nine 

Early on October 3, a tropical depression developed in the South-Central Caribbean about /h) east of Serrana Bank and the Miskito Cays. Curving west-northwest without further intensification, the weak cyclone made landfall near Barra Patuca in Gracias a Dios Department, Honduras, shortly before 12:00 UTC on October 4. Shortly thereafter, the storm gradually turned just north of due west, and early on October 5, after degenerating into a tropical depression, it made a second landfall over Belize just south of Alabama Wharf in Toledo District. Less than 12 hours later, the cyclone dissipated over eastern Guatemala.

Hurricane Ten 

The Great Havana-Bermuda Hurricane of 1926 

Strengthening into a minimal tropical storm the next day, it gradually curved to the north-northwest over the next four days, becoming a hurricane on October 18. It then quickly intensified to a major hurricane early on October 19 as it turned northward toward western Cuba. The cyclone then continued strengthening, peaking at  before making landfall on the Cuban mainland south of Güira de Melena. The cyclone then weakened and turned to the northeast on October 21, passing within  of the Florida Keys while remaining east of Florida. Three days thereafter, on October 25 the storm executed a clockwise, semicircular loop to the south-southwest, and a day later it lost hurricane intensity. Gradually curving to the west, the cyclone dissipated early on October 28, though it was once believed to have been an extratropical cyclone as early as October 23.

The hurricane inflicted devastation along its path, causing at least 709 deaths in Cuba and Bermuda. Upon striking Cuba, the hurricane caused catastrophic damage and as many as 600 deaths. Several small towns in the storm's path were completely destroyed and damage estimates exceeded $100 million (1926 USD). In the upper Florida Keys and on Key Biscayne, minimal hurricane conditions occurred, causing minor damage in South Florida. In Bermuda, 40% of the structures were damaged and two homes destroyed, but otherwise damage was light in the harbor. While weather forecasters knew of the storm's approach on Bermuda, it covered the thousand miles from the Bahamas to Bermuda so rapidly it apparently struck with few warning signs aside from heavy swells. On October 21, with the eye of the storm still  from Bermuda, weather forecasts from the United States called for the hurricane to strike the island on the following morning with gale force. The  , based at the HMD Bermuda, was returning from providing hurricane relief in the Bahamas and was overtaken by the storm shortly before she could make harbor. Unable to enter through Bermuda's reefline, she fought the storm for more than five hours before she was sunk with the loss of 85 men. The British merchant ship Eastway was also sunk near Bermuda. The Royal Naval Dockyard was being hammered and never took its anemometer down. It measured  at 13:00 UTC, before the wind destroyed it.

October tropical depression 
A trough organized into a tropical depression just east-northeast of Bermuda on October 17. However, by October 18, the depression degenerated back into an open trough.

Tropical Storm Eleven 

Moving northwest, the cyclone rapidly attained peak winds of  early on November 13 but failed to intensify further over the next three days. Curving parabolically to the northeast on November 15, it weakened to a tropical depression early the next day before hitting the Isla de la Juventud in Cuba. 12 hours later, after striking mainland Cuba, it dissipated over the southern Straits of Florida.

Other systems 
Reports from the government of the Mexican state of Veracruz indicate that in late September 1926 a tropical disturbance formed in the northwest Caribbean Sea, then moved across the Yucatán Peninsula and the Bay of Campeche to strike Veracruz as a hurricane on September 28. The storm reportedly began with sudden fury at 16:00 UTC and produced unspecified winds as high as —if sustained, equal to those of a strong Category 3 hurricane—causing boats to be stranded, roofs to be torn off, and trees and electric cables to be blown down, though the worst conditions reportedly lasted only two hours. The reported storm ruined most of the seashore as a storm tide destroyed the local breakwater, including at the historic Hotel Villa del Mar in the city of Veracruz, demolishing most of the hotel as well as the yacht club there, and forced train service to be suspended. Several ships were sunk in the harbor, and several sailors were feared drowned. However, a peer-reviewed publication in 2012, which reanalyzed the 1926 Atlantic hurricane season, did not confirm its supposed existence.

Seasonal effects 

|-
| One ||  || bgcolor=#| || bgcolor=#| || bgcolor=#| || Lesser Antilles, Puerto Rico, Turks and Caicos Islands, The Bahamas, Northern Florida ||  || > ||
|-
| Two ||  || bgcolor=#| || bgcolor=#| || bgcolor=#| || Bermuda, Nova Scotia ||  Unknown ||  ~55 ||
|-
| Three ||  || bgcolor=#| || bgcolor=#| || bgcolor=#| || Louisiana ||  ||  ||
|-
| Unnumbered ||  || bgcolor=#| || bgcolor=#| || bgcolor=#| || None ||  Unknown ||  None ||
|-
| Four ||  || bgcolor=#| || bgcolor=#| || bgcolor=#| || Bermuda, Nova Scotia ||  Unknown ||  Unknown ||
|-
| Five ||  || bgcolor=#| || bgcolor=#| || bgcolor=#| || None ||  None ||  None ||
|-
| Six ||  || bgcolor=#| || bgcolor=#| || bgcolor=#| || Cuba, The Bahamas ||  Unknown ||  Unknown ||
|-
| Seven ||  || bgcolor=#| || bgcolor=#| || bgcolor=#| || Puerto Rico, Turks and Caicos Islands, The Bahamas, Florida, United States Gulf Coast ||  || > ||
|-
| Eight ||  || bgcolor=#| || bgcolor=#| || bgcolor=#| || Azores ||  Unknown ||  Unknown ||
|-
| Unnumbered ||  || bgcolor=#| || bgcolor=#| || bgcolor=#| || None ||  Unknown ||  None ||
|-
| Nine ||  || bgcolor=#| || bgcolor=#| || bgcolor=#| || Spanish Honduras, British Honduras ||  Unknown ||  Unknown ||
|-
| Ten ||  || bgcolor=#| || bgcolor=#| || bgcolor=#| || Cuba, Southern Florida, The Bahamas, Bermuda || > ||  ||
|-
| Unnumbered ||  || bgcolor=#| || bgcolor=#| || bgcolor=#| || None ||  Unknown ||  None ||
|-
| Eleven ||  || bgcolor=#| || bgcolor=#| || bgcolor=#| || Cuba ||  Unknown ||  Unknown ||
|-

See also 

 List of tropical cyclones
 Atlantic hurricane season
 1900–1940 South Pacific cyclone seasons
 1900–1950 South-West Indian Ocean cyclone seasons
 1920s Australian region cyclone seasons

References

Bibliography 
 Attaway, John A. (1999). Hurricanes and Florida Agriculture. Lakeland, Florida: Florida Science Source. .
 
 Stronge, William B. (2008). The Sunshine Economy: An Economic History of Florida since the Civil War. University Press of Florida. .

External links 

 Monthly Weather Review
 NHC FAQ E12

 
Articles which contain graphical timelines